A Study in Scarlet is a 1914 American silent film directed by and starring Francis Ford as Sherlock Holmes. It is based on the Sir Arthur Conan Doyle 1887 novel of the same name.

It is believed that Ford's younger brother, John Ford, portrayed Dr. Watson.

The film was released on 29 December 1914, one day after the release of the British film of the same name. It is considered a lost film.

References

External links

Sherlock Holmes films based on works by Arthur Conan Doyle
1914 films
Lost American films
American silent short films
American black-and-white films
American mystery films
1910s mystery films
1914 lost films
1910s American films
Silent mystery films
Silent thriller films